Mare Rosso is made by The Coca-Cola Company in Spain.  It is a non-alcoholic soft drink with a "Bitter Herb" flavor. It was developed as a competing drink to PepsiCo's Bitter Kas.

Coca-Cola brands